Chouteau is a surname of a French-American family.

Chouteau also refers to:
Chouteau County, Montana
Chouteau, Oklahoma

See also
Lake Chouteau, on the Teton River
Chouteau Formation, geologic formation in Illinois, Iowa, Kansas, and Missouri
Chouteau Group, geologic group in Missouri
Chouteau Township, Madison County, Illinois
Chouteau Island, St. Louis, Missouri